Sense of direction is the ability to know one's location and perform wayfinding. It is related to cognitive maps, spatial awareness, and spatial cognition.
Sense of direction can be impaired by brain damage, such as in the case of topographical disorientation.

Humans create spatial maps whenever they go somewhere. Neurons called place cells inside the hippocampus fire individually while a person makes their way through an environment. This was first discovered in rats, when the neurons of the hippocampus were recorded. Certain neurons fired whenever the rat was in a certain area of its environment. These neurons form a grid when they are all put together on the same plane.

Santa Barbara Sense-of-Direction Scale 
Sense of direction can be measured with the Santa Barbara Sense-of-Direction Scale, a self-assessed psychometric test designed in 2002. This scale has been used to study sense of direction in many contexts, such as driving.

See also 
 Direction determination
 Personal relative direction
 Spatial disorientation
 Spatial ability

References 

Cognitive psychology
Behavioural sciences
Spatial cognition